Miles Howell (9 September 1893 – 23 February 1976) was an English first-class cricketer active 1913–39 who played for Surrey (awarded county cap 1920). He was born in Thames Ditton; died in Worplesdon.

References

1893 births
1976 deaths
English cricketers
Surrey cricketers
Marylebone Cricket Club cricketers
Oxford University cricketers
Gentlemen cricketers
Free Foresters cricketers
People educated at Repton School
Alumni of Oriel College, Oxford
Oxford and Cambridge Universities cricketers
Harlequins cricketers
H. D. G. Leveson Gower's XI cricketers
P. F. Warner's XI cricketers